Fifeshire is an old name for Fife, an area of Scotland.

Fifeshire may also refer to:

 Fifeshire (UK Parliament constituency)
 Fifeshire (Parliament of Scotland constituency)
 Fifeshire, a New Zealand Company ship that brought immigrants to New Zealand in 1843
 Fifeshire FM, a Nelson, New Zealand radio station

See also